A Portrait of a Stranger is a 2021 Russian drama film directed by Sergey Osipyan. It is scheduled to be theatrically released on January 1, 2022.

Plot 
The film is set in 1974 in Moscow. In the center of the plot is the adult actor Oleg, who works on the radio with a tired look, an attractive smile and a deep voice. Suddenly, his radio play is closed and his wife kicks him out of the house, which leads to an unexpected turn of events.

Cast

Awards and nominations
2021 Golden Unicorn Awards: nominated for Best Film award.

References

External links 
 

2021 films
2020s Russian-language films
Russian drama films
2021 drama films